Cheshmeh Kabud (also Romanized as Cheshmeh Kabūd) is a village in Cham Chamal Rural District, Bisotun District, Harsin County, Kermanshah Province, Iran. At the 2006 census, its population was 49, in 8 families.

References 

Populated places in Harsin County